Beinn Talaidh (762 m) is a peak on the Isle of Mull, Scotland, located in the mountainous centre of the Island.

The mountain is shaped like a symmetrical cone and can be climbed from the steep facing south side, or more gentle northern side along Glen Forsa. Beinn Talaidh was for many years classed as a Corbett before a resurvey found it to be slightly lower than expected, and it was thus demoted to Graham status; however it is the highest of the 219 Grahams in Scotland.

See also
List of Graham mountains in Scotland

References

Mountains and hills of Argyll and Bute
Mountains and hills of the Scottish islands
Landforms of the Isle of Mull
Marilyns of Scotland
Grahams